Vestbygd Church is a parish church of the Church of Norway in Lødingen Municipality in Nordland county, Norway. It is located in the village of Vågehamn. It is one of the two churches for the Lødingen parish which is part of the Vesterålen prosti (deanery) in the Diocese of Sør-Hålogaland. The white, wooden church was built in a long church style in 1885 using plans drawn up by the architect Johannes Henrik Nissen. The church seats about 230 people. The church holds worship services one Sunday each month (services are held at the nearby Lødingen Church on the other Sundays).

On 1 January 2020, the churches in Lødingen Municipality were transferred from the Ofoten prosti to the Vesterålen prosti.

See also
List of churches in Sør-Hålogaland

References

External links
 

Lødingen
Churches in Nordland
Wooden churches in Norway
19th-century Church of Norway church buildings
Churches completed in 1885
1885 establishments in Norway
Long churches in Norway